Burić is a South Slavic surname common in Croatia and Bosnia. It may refer to:
 Andrej Burić (born 1989), Croatian cross-country skier
 Benjamin Burić (born 1990), Bosnian Croat handball player
 Damir Burić, several Croatian people
Ivica Burić (born 1963), Croatian basketball coach and former player
 Jasmin Burić (born 1987), Bosnian football goalkeeper
 Lara Burić (born 2003), Croatian handball player
Marija Pejčinović Burić (born 1963), Croatian politician
Mario Burić (born 1991), Croatian footballer
 Mirsada Burić (born 1970), Bosnian long-distance runner
Nikola Burić (born 1996), Croatian football forward
Senjamin Burić (born 1990), Bosnian handball player, twin brother of Benjamin
 Viktor Burić (1897-1983), Croatian archbishop
Željko Burić (born 1955), Croatian ophthalmologist and politician
 Zlatko Burić (born 1953), Croatian Danish actor

Croatian surnames
Bosnian surnames
Serbian surnames
Montenegrin surnames